The law of Illinois consists of several levels, including constitutional, statutory, and regulatory law, as well as case law and local law. The Illinois Compiled Statutes (ILCS) form the general statutory law.

Sources

The Constitution of Illinois is the foremost source of state law. Legislation is enacted by the Illinois General Assembly, published in the Laws of Illinois, and codified in the Illinois Compiled Statutes (ILCS). State agencies publish regulations (sometimes called administrative law) in the Illinois Register, which are in turn codified in the Illinois Administrative Code. Illinois's legal system is based on common law, which is interpreted by case law through the decisions of the Supreme Court and the Appellate Courts, which are published on the website of the Supreme Court. Counties, townships, cities, and villages may also promulgate local ordinances. There are also several sources of persuasive authority, which are not binding authority but are useful to lawyers and judges insofar as they help to clarify the current state of the law.

Constitution
The Constitution of Illinois is the foundation of the government of Illinois and vests the legislative power of the state in the Illinois General Assembly. The Illinois Constitution in turn is subordinate only to the Constitution of the United States, which is the supreme law of the land.

Legislation
Pursuant to the state constitution, the Illinois General Assembly has enacted legislation. These legislative acts are published in the official Laws of Illinois and are called "session laws". The Illinois Compiled Statutes (ILCS) are the codified statutes of a general and permanent nature.

The Illinois Legislative Reference Bureau (LRB) makes additions, deletions, and changes to ILCS. There is no official version of the ILCS. There are several unofficial versions: Illinois State Bar Association's/West's Illinois Compiled Statutes, West's Smith–Hurd Illinois Compiled Statutes Annotated, and LexisNexis's Illinois Compiled Statutes Annotated.

Administrative law

Pursuant to certain statutes, state agencies have promulgated regulations. The regulations are codified in the Illinois Administrative Code. The Illinois Register is the weekly publication containing proposed and adopted rules. There also exist administrative law decisions.

Both the Illinois Administrative Code and Illinois Register are maintained by the Illinois Secretary of State. The Illinois Administrative Code was last printed in 1996. The General Assembly's Joint Committee on Administrative Rules also publishes online versions.

The Flinn Report is a weekly newsletter published by the Joint Committee meant to inform and educate Illinois citizens about current rulemaking activity.

Case law

Illinois's legal system is based on common law, which is interpreted by case law through the decisions of the Supreme Court of Illinois and the Illinois Appellate Court. The official reporter for opinions of the Supreme Court and the Appellate Court are published on the website of the Illinois Supreme Court using a public domain case citation. There are also unofficial sources such as West's Illinois Decisions (an Illinois-specific version of the North Eastern Reporter) with opinions since 1886. Illinois Appellate Court decisions from before 1935 are not binding. Illinois Circuit Court decisions are not published, but jury verdicts and settlements are published in the monthly Illinois Jury Verdict Reporter, with regular updates from the Chicago Daily Law Bulletin, and the weekly Cook County Jury Verdict Reporter. Decisions of the Illinois Court of Claims are published in the Court of Claims Reports.

The Illinois Digest is an indexed compilation of summaries of opinions, or digest.

The opinions of the Supreme Court and Appellate Court had been published in the Illinois Reports and Illinois Appellate Court Reports, respectively, from 1831-2011; according to the University of Chicago Library, since 1819 and 1877, respectively. Illinois Circuit Court decisions were published from 1907–1909.

Local ordinances

Illinois counties, townships, cities, and villages may promulgate local ordinances.

The Government of Chicago operates as a special charter municipality. The Journal of the Proceedings of the City Council of the City of Chicago is the official publication of the acts of the Chicago City Council, and the Municipal Code of Chicago is the codification of its local ordinances of a general and permanent nature.

Shepard's Illinois Citations includes judicial interpretations of local ordinances.

Other
In addition, there are also several sources of persuasive authority, which are not binding authority but are useful to lawyers and judges insofar as they help to clarify the current state of the law. Illinois Jurisprudence and Illinois Law and Practice are two major legal encyclopedias. The Illinois Institute for Continuing Legal Education (IICLE) also publishes guides for continuing legal education.

Unique features
Illinois was one of the last remaining states to recognize the alienation of affections tort. However, recognition of the tort was statutorily abrogated at the beginning of 2016, pursuant to the Alienation of Affections Abolition Act.

See also

Topics
 Gun laws in Illinois
 LGBT rights in Illinois
 Illinois wiretapping law

Other
 Politics of Illinois
 Law enforcement in Illinois
 Crime in Illinois
 Law of the United States

References

External links
 Illinois Compiled Statutes from the Illinois Legislative Reference Bureau
 Illinois Administrative Code from the Illinois General Assembly Joint Committee on Administrative Rules
 Public Acts of the Illinois General Assembly
 Laws of Illinois from Western Illinois University
 Illinois Register from the Illinois Secretary of State
 Cook County Code from Municode
 Municipal Code of Chicago from American Legal Publishing
 Chicago Decoded (unofficial Chicago Municipal Code) from the OpenGov Foundation
 Local ordinance codes from Public.Resource.Org
 Flinn Reports from the Illinois General Assembly Joint Committee on Administrative Rules
 Case law: 

 
State law in the United States
Government of Illinois